Tatkon Township is one of eight townships of Naypyidaw Union Territory, Burma.

History
The area comprising Lewe Township was previously called Nga-nwe-kon (ငနွဲ့ကုန်း), Nwekon (နွယ်ကုန်း), and Wa-nwe-kon-zu (ဝါးနွယ်ကုန်းစု), in reference to its establishment on a hillock. Since 1788, it has been known as Lewe.

Demographics

2014

The 2014 Myanmar Census reported that Tatkon Township had a population of 217,093. The population density was 120.5 people per km². The census reported that the median age was 28.1 years, and 92 males per 100 females. There were 51,747 households; the mean household size was 4.1.

References

Naypyidaw